53rd Brigade or 53rd Infantry Brigade may refer to:

 53rd Brigade (Greece) of the Greek Army during the Greek Civil War
 53rd Indian Brigade of the British Indian Army in the First World War 
 53rd Indian Infantry Brigade of the British Indian Army in the Second World War 
 53rd Brigade (United Kingdom) of the British Army during the First and Second World Wars
 53rd Mountain Motorized Infantry Brigade (People's Republic of China)
 53rd Anti-Aircraft Rocket Brigade of the Russian Ground Forces
 53rd Mechanized Brigade (Ukraine)
 53rd Infantry Brigade Combat Team (United States)

See also

 53rd Division (disambiguation)